is a Japanese manga series written and illustrated by Nobuhiro Watsuki. The story begins during the 11th year of the Meiji period in Japan (1878) and follows a former assassin from the Bakumatsu, known as Hitokiri Battosai. After his work against the bakufu, Hitokiri Battosai disappears to become Himura Kenshin: a wandering swordsman who protects the people of Japan with a vow never to take another life. Watsuki wrote the series upon his desire to make a shōnen manga different from the other ones that were published at the time, with Kenshin being a former assassin and the story taking a more serious tone as it continued. The manga revolves around themes of atonement, peace, and romance.

The manga was serialized in Shueisha's Weekly Shōnen Jump magazine from April 1994 to September 1999. The complete work consists of 28 tankōbon volumes, while years later it was reprinted into 22 kanzenban volumes. Studio Gallop, Studio Deen and SPE Visual Works adapted the manga into an anime television series, which aired in Japan from January 1996 to September 1998. Besides an animated feature film, two series of original video animations (OVAs) were also produced. The first adapted stories from the manga that were not featured in the anime, while the second was a sequel to the manga. Several art and guidebooks for Rurouni Kenshin have been published, and writer Kaoru Shizuka has authored three official light novels which were published by Shueisha. Many video games have also been released for the PlayStation, PlayStation 2, and PlayStation Portable consoles. A series of five live-action theatrical films adaptations were released from 2012 to 2021. A second anime television series adaptation by Liden Films is set to premiere in 2023.

The manga, as well as the first light novel and first guidebook, has received a complete North American release by Viz Media. Rurouni Kenshin is subtitled "Wandering Samurai" in some English versions. The Rurouni Kenshin manga has over 72 million copies in circulation as of 2019, making it one of the best-selling manga series. The series has received praise from various publications for manga, anime and other media, with both having received a good response on the characters' designs and historical setting. In 2017, Watsuki began a direct sequel titled Rurouni Kenshin: The Hokkaido Arc in Jump Square.

Plot

In the early Meiji era, after participating in the Boshin War as the assassin "Hitokiri Battōsai", Himura Kenshin wanders the countryside of Japan with a reverse blade katana. He is offering protection and aid to those in need as atonement for the murders he once committed. When arriving in Tokyo in the 11th year of Meiji (1878), he meets a young woman named Kamiya Kaoru, who is in the middle of a fight with a murderer - who claims to be the Hitokiri Battōsai - tarnishing the name of the swordsmanship school that she teaches. Kenshin decides to help her and defeats the fake Battōsai. After discovering that Kenshin is the real infamous assassin, Kaoru offers him a place to stay at her dojo, noting that he is peace-loving and not cold-hearted, as his reputation implies. Kenshin accepts and begins to establish lifelong relationships with many people such as Sagara Sanosuke, a former Sekihō Army member; Myōjin Yahiko, an orphan from a samurai family who is also living with Kaoru as her student; and a doctor named Takani Megumi, caught in the opium trade. However, he also deals with his fair share of enemies, new and old, including the former leader of the Oniwabanshū, Shinomori Aoshi.

After several months of living in the dojo, Kenshin faces a rival from the Bakumatsu turned police officer, Saitō Hajime. This challenge turns out to be a test to face his successor, Shishio Makoto, who plans to conquer Japan by destroying the Meiji Government, starting with Kyoto. Feeling that Shishio's faction may attack his friends, Kenshin meets Shishio alone to defeat him. However, many of his friends, including a young Oniwabanshū named Makimachi Misao, whom he meets in his travels, decide to help him in his fight. After his first meeting with him, Kenshin realizes he needs to get stronger to defeat Shishio without becoming the cold assassin he was in the past and returns to the man who taught him kenjutsu, Hiko Seijūrō, to learn the school's final technique. He finally accepts his friends' help and defeats Shishio in a close fight. After that, Shishio dies burning to ashes after passing the limit of his abnormal body condition. A reformed Shinomori stays in Kyoto with the surviving Oniwabanshū.

When Kenshin and his friends return to Tokyo, he finds Yukishiro Enishi, who plans to enact revenge. At this point, it is revealed that, during the Bakumatsu, Kenshin was to be married to a woman named Yukishiro Tomoe. She had initially wanted to avenge the death of her first fiancé, whom Kenshin had assassinated, but instead, they both fell in love, and she got proposed to. It is eventually revealed that Tomoe was related to Edo guards who wanted to kill Kenshin. They outwitted Tomoe after realizing her deception first and captured her to use as bait. Kenshin rushed to the rescue. Although the ambushers managed to injure him severely, Kenshin managed to kill almost all of them and moved on. Then, in the final fight against the group leader, Kenshin accidentally kills Tomoe, who jumps in at the last second to help Kenshin create an opening to win the battle. Wanting to take revenge for the death of his sister, Enishi kidnaps Kaoru and leaves behind a corpse doll bearing a stunning resemblance of her for Kenshin to find and momentarily grieve over. Once discovering that Kaoru is alive, Kenshin and his friends set out to rescue her. A final battle between Kenshin and Enishi follows, and the former assassin emerges as the victor. Misao brings Tomoe's diary to Enishi who keeps it in a village to hide alongside his missing father.

Four years later, Kenshin has married Kaoru and has a son named Himura Kenji. Now at peace with himself, Kenshin gives his reverse-blade sword to Yahiko as a ceremonial gift.

Production

One-shots
A prototype series titled Rurouni: Meiji Swordsman Romantic Story appeared as a pair of separate short stories published in 1992 and 1993. The first story, published in December 1992 in the Weekly Shōnen Jump Winter Special issue of 1993, featured an earlier version of Kenshin stopping a crime lord from taking over the Kamiya family dojo. Watsuki described the first Rurouni story, echoing the "Megumi Arc," as a "pilot" for Rurouni Kenshin. According to Watsuki, the final Rurouni Kenshin series was not composed entirely of his free will. Describing the creation of historical stories as "hard," Watsuki initially wanted to make his next series in a contemporary setting. An editor approached Watsuki and asked him to make a new historical story. With the historical concept, Watsuki intended to use the Bakumatsu period from Moeyo Ken (Burn, O Sword) with a story akin to Sanshiro Sugata. Watsuki experimented with various titles, including Nishin (Two-Hearts) Kenshin, Yorozuya (Jack-of-All-Trades) Kenshin, and variations of "Rurouni" and "Kenshin" with different kanji in that order.

The second Rurouni story, published in April 1993 in the Weekly Shōnen Jump 21–22 double issue of that year, featured Kenshin helping a wealthy girl named Raikōji Chizuru. Watsuki recalled experiencing difficulty when condensing "everything" into 31 pages for that story. He said that he "put all [his] soul into it" but sighs when looking at it from his perspective after the publication of the Rurouni Kenshin Volume 1 graphic novel in Japan. Watsuki describes that second Rurouni: Meiji Swordsman Romantic Story as receiving mediocre reviews and about two hundred letters. He referred to it as a "side story."

The design model for Hiko Seijuro, Kenshin's master, in Rurouni Kenshin is the character of the same name from his one-shot manga "Crescent Moon of the Warring States," but Watsuki also added some influences from Hiken Majin Hajerun in Takeshi Obata's Arabian Lamp-Lamp. At the time, Watsuki said that he was fascinated by images of "manliness" and that Hiko is one of the first characters to reflect this fascination. Since Watsuki's debut work contained a tall, black-haired man in "showy" armor, he wanted to make a character "completely opposite" to the debut character; the new character ended up "coming out like a girl". According to Watsuki, he used "no real motif" when creating Kenshin and placed a cross-shaped scar on his face "not knowing what else to do." Like several characters, Kenshin was influenced the Shinsengumi with Kenshin being affected by Okita Sōji and Saitō Hajime in order to give him an air of mystery.

Publication and influences

During his childhood, Watsuki used to practice kendo, which influenced his making of the series. Although Watsuki developed various one-shots before the official serialization from the series. While naming the characters, he based some of their names from places he used to live such a Makimachi Misaos's "Makimachi" and Sanjō Tsubame, who are named after places from Niigata.

When the manga series started to be published in Weekly Shōnen Jump, Watsuki had little hope in the development of the series. He planned to finish the story in approximately 30 chapters, ending with Kenshin's departure from Tokyo similarly to the one from volume 7. Kenshin's enemies would have been people from Kyoto who would send an assassin to kill Kenshin. When the Oniwabanshū were introduced during the serialization, Watsuki noted that the series could be longer as he had created various main characters. In that time, there was a survey, and the series had become very popular.

For its seventh volume, Watsuki's boss suggested to him that it was time to make a longer story-arc, which resulted in the creation of the fights between Kenshin and Shishio Makoto. The arc was only meant to be serialized for one year, but it ended up being one year-and-a-half-long. This arc was also done to develop Kenshin's character as he considered him not to have a weak point. Watsuki commented that his artistic skills were honed with this arc, as he could draw everything he wanted to. The last arc from the manga was meant to be much shorter, but it turned out to be a fairly long one as he could not present it simplistically. Watsuki originally made this arc prior to the series' start, having already thought about how would Kenshin's scar had been made. Because of the dark style of the Kyoto arc, Watsuki created the comical Mikimachi Misao in order to contrast Kenshin's serious side.

Being fascinated by the Shinsengumi, Watsuki designed the characters by basing their characteristics to that of the real Shinsengumi members and also used fictional representation of them and other historical characters from the Bakumatsu period of Japan. The historical characters were considered to be a hard task by Watsuki. Due to problems with the characterization from Sagara Sōzō, Watsuki decided to illustrate Saitō Hajime in his own style avoiding the historical figure. He felt very good with Saitō's character having noted he fit very well in the manga. However, Watsuki mentioned that many Japanese fans of the Shinsengumi complained about the personality of Saitō, as he was made sadistic. Additionally, the final shot of Kenshin returning to Kaoru's dojo was inspired by the final shot of the Rurouni Kenshin anime's first opening theme:"Sobakasu" by Judy and Mary.

In final arc of the manga, Watsuki wanted to make the five comrades in this storyline as "scum-like" as possible. But because he created villains with no ideals or beliefs, this made it difficult to portray them as an enjoyable read. The story took a darker tone as most of the characters believed Kaoru was killed by Yukishiro Enishi which made Kenshin question his own way of living and escape to a village of wanderers. Watsuki did not enjoy angst in Kenshin so his friend Myōjin Yahiko took the place as the series' protagonist until Kenshin recovers. Even though the plot for the "remembrance episodes" of Kenshin's past was already set before serialization started, which was three and a half years before her debut, Watsuki was filled with regrets in how he portrayed Yukishiro Tomoe for unspecified reasons. The final villains, the Sū-shi,n had no personality models and were created simply to "fill out the numbers." As the story advanced towards Kenshin's final battle, Watsuki realized that the other characters would have no "glamour" and created the Sū-shin on the spot.

Ending
Watsuki also had ideas to create a "Hokkaido episode, a sequel" but wanted to start a new manga and so ended Rurouni Kenshin with the last arc he made. Due to the dark nature of Kenshin's life, Watsuki ended the manga in the Jinchu arc afraid that if he continued writing, the series would not fit the shonen manga demography. In 2012, Watsuki revealed that when he clashed with the editorial staff at the end of the series, his editor Hisashi Sasaki understood his intentions and saw that he was at his physical limit and backed him up. He said it was out of respect and appreciation for the readers that he ended the popular series while it was still popular. Nevertheless, Watsuki was happy with how he ended Rurouni Kenshin. He felt it was a good place to end the narrative. In contrast, most series keep being pushed and pushed until they lose popularity and be cancelled. Watsuki was glad Rurouni Kenshin did not end like this.

For the series' ending, Watsuki conceived new designs with potential of a sequel in the future. Initially, Watsuki had planned to make Kenshin's hair shorter before the end; however, he found this to be similar to the character Multi in To Heart. Additionally, Himura Kenji was introduced in the finale as the son of Kenshin and Kaoru; even though the character was "cliché" Watsuki felt that Kenji had to appear. An elder Sanosuke was drafted by Watsuki to appear in the manga's finale but this idea was scrapped. In the manga's final story arc, the design was used for Sanosuke's father, Higashidani Kamishimoemon. The author added that he felt attachment towards Enishi and that he would someday like to use Enishi in a future work.

Another idea explored for a sequel was the handling of Yahiko as teenager. Watsuki had redesigned his appearance. He wanted Yahiko to impress manga readers  so that he  could  be a protagonist for a possible  series sequel. He said this goal influenced his design of Yahiko, with Kenshin's physical appearance as well as Sanosuke's personality. Although he suggested he was not going to make a sequel, he said the main characters would be Yahiko, Sanjō Tsubame and Tsukayama Yutarō. Watsuki thought about writing a story in which Yahiko and Tsubame would have a son, Myōjin Shin'ya, who would become a skilled swordsman.

Themes
The series' main theme is responsibility as seen through Kenshin's action as he wants to atone for all the people he killed during the Bakumatsu by aiding innocent people by wielding a non-lethal sword. Marco Olivier from the Nelson Mandela Metropolitan University said that the sakabatō symbolizes Kenshin's oath not to kill again which has been found challenging by other warriors appearing in the series. This theme also encourages former drug dealer Takani Megumi into becoming a doctor upon learning of Kenshin's past and actions. Another theme is power, which is mostly seen by Sagara Sanosuke and Myojin Yahiko. However, like Megumi, these two characters are also influenced by the main character as they wish to become stronger to assist Kenshin across the plot. Additionally, the series discourages revenge as seen in the final arc when Yukishiro Enishi believes he succeeded in getting his revenge on Kenshin but starts having hallucinations of his late sister with a sad expression on her face.  As an "outlet" for Watsuki's kendo emotions, Yahiko "knows a pain that hero-types like Himura Kenshin and Sagara Sanosuke can never know". As a result, Yahiko was made a stronger character little by little to relate with the demography. eventually giving him a stronger characterization during the Kyoto arc which surprised his readers.

When questioned about the series' theme being Kenshin's self-redemption, Watsuki mentioned that when he was young, he used to read shōjo manga and that it influenced his writing of Rurouni Kenshin. He added that he wanted to make a story different from other comics as he considers the main character Kenshin is neither a good nor evil character. Since volume 7, Watsuki mentioned the series took a more adult tone due to the various conflicts in the story but commented it was influenced by the shōjo manga he read. Through the series' development, Watsuki was deciding if Kamiya Kaoru's character was going to die before the end. However, he later decided to keep Kaoru alive as he came to the conclusion he wanted a happy ending and that the manga is aimed at young readers. In The Oxford Handbook of American Folklore and Folklife Studies, Kenshin is regarded as a "far cry" from American superheroes due to his androgynous look and selfdeprecating personality. However, the character is said to be relatable to the Eastern audience through Kenshin's quest of redemption, which is called as the main theme of the manga. The manga is further noted to have a balance between individualism and community.

Watsuki said he was an "infatuated" type of person rather than a "passionate" kind of person, therefore Rurouni Kenshin is a "Meiji Swordsman Story" as opposed to being a "Meiji Love Story." According to the book Bringing Forth a World: Engaged Pedagogy in the Japanese University the manga reflects the confusion of the Japanese society after the big economy disenchantment in the early 1990s. In confronts visualizations of Japanese education in a manner that contrasts school books especially because of the series' young demography. Since the manga focuses on realism but is aimed towards young readers, the series is notable for changing the portrayals of samurais in order to create a more optimistic take in comparison to real life events. The unique take on Kenshin's handling gave the manga the concept of "neo shonen" due to how different it was from previous Weekly Shonen Jump series.

Release

Written and illustrated by Nobuhiro Watsuki, Rurouni Kenshin was serialized in Shueisha's shōnen manga magazine Weekly Shōnen Jump from April 25, 1994, to September 21, 1999. The 255 individual chapters were collected and published in 28 tankōbon volumes by Shueisha, with the first volume released on September 9, 1994, and the last on November 4, 1999. They re-released the series in a 22-volume kanzenban edition between July 4, 2006, and May 2, 2007. Shueisha published a 14-volume bunkoban edition between January 18, 2012, and July 18, 2012. A single chapter follow up to the series that follows the character of Yahiko Myōjin, was originally published in Weekly Shōnen Jump in 2000 after the conclusion of the series. Left out of the original volumes, it was added as an extra to the final kanzenban release.

In December 2011, Shueisha announced Watsuki would be putting his current series, Embalming -The Another Tale of Frankenstein-, on hold to begin a "reboot" of Rurouni Kenshin, called Rurouni Kenshin: Restoration, as a tie-in to the live-action movie. The series began in the June 2012 issue of Jump Square, which was released on May 2, 2012, and ended in the July 2013 issue on June 4, 2013. The reboot depicts the battles that are featured in the first live-action film. Another special titled Rurouni Kenshin: Meiji Swordsman Romantic Story: Chapter 0, was published in Weekly Shōnen Jump in August 2012 as a prologue to Restoration and included in its first volume. In 2014, Watsuki wrote a two-chapter spin-off titled Rurouni Kenshin: Master of Flame for Jump SQ., which tells how Shishio met Yumi and formed the Juppongatana.

Watsuki and his wife, Kaworu Kurosaki, collaborated on a two chapter spinoff titled Rurouni Kenshin Side Story: The Ex-Con Ashitaro for the ninth anniversary of Jump SQ. in 2016. It acts as a prologue to the Rurouni Kenshin: The Hokkaido Arc, which began in September 2017 as a sequel to the original manga series. In 2021, Watsuki created the manga  that was exclusively shown at an exhibition celebrating the 25th anniversary of Rurouni Kenshin. It serves as an epilogue to chapter 81 of the original manga and shows the first time Kenshin used his sakabatō.

Rurouni Kenshin was licensed for an English language release in North America by Viz Media. The first volume of the series was released on October 7, 2003. Although the first volumes were published on an irregular basis, since volume 7 Viz established a monthly basis due to good sales and consumer demands. Therefore, the following volumes were published until July 5, 2006, when the final volume was released. Yahiko no Sakabatō was also published in English Shonen Jump during 2006. Between January 29, 2008, and March 16, 2010, Viz re-released the manga in a nine-volume omnibus format called "Viz Big Edition", which collects three volumes in one. The ninth and final volume includes Yahiko no Sakabato and Cherry Blossoms in Spring. They released a similar "3-in-1 Edition" across nine volumes between January 3, 2017, and January 1, 2019. Viz uses the actual ordering of Japanese names, with the family name or surname before the given name, within the series to reduce confusion and because Rurouni Kenshin is a historical series.

Adaptations

Anime series

An anime television series adaptation of Rurouni Kenshin,  produced by SPE Visual Works and Fuji TV, animated by Studio Gallop (episode 1 to 66) and Studio Deen (episode 67 to 95), and directed by Kazuhiro Furuhashi, was broadcast in Japan on Fuji TV from January 10, 1996, to September 8, 1998.

A second anime television series adaptation by Liden Films was announced at the Jump Festa '22 event on December 19, 2021.

Animated film

An anime film with an original story, titled , also known as Rurouni Kenshin: Requiem for Patriots, originally released in North America as Samurai X: The Motion Picture, premiered in Japan on December 20, 1997.

Original video animations

A 4-episode original video animation (OVA), titled Rurouni Kenshin: Trust & Betrayal, which served as a prequel to the anime television series, was released in Japan in 1999.

A 2-episode OVA, titled Rurouni Kenshin: Reflection, which served as a sequel to the anime television series, was released in Japan from 2001 to 2002.

A 2-episode OVA, Rurouni Kenshin: New Kyoto Arc, which remade the series' Kyoto arc, was released in Japan from 2011 to 2012.

Live-action films

Five live-action films have been released theatrically. The live-action film adaptation of Rurouni Kenshin was announced on June 28, 2011. Produced by Warner Bros., with actual film production done by Studio Swan, the films were directed by Keishi Ōtomo and star Takeru Satoh (of Kamen Rider Den-O fame) as Kenshin, Munetaka Aoki as Sanosuke Sagara and Emi Takei as Kaoru. The first film, titled Rurouni Kenshin, was released on August 25, 2012, in Japan. In August 2013, it was announced that two sequels were being filmed simultaneously for release in 2014. Rurouni Kenshin: Kyoto Inferno and Rurouni Kenshin: The Legend Ends adapt the Kyoto arc of the manga. On April 12, 2019, it was announced that two new live-action films will adapt the Remembrance/Tenchu & Jinchu arcs. The films, titled Rurouni Kenshin: The Final and Rurouni Kenshin: The Beginning, premiered in 2021.

Stage shows
In 2016, the Takarazuka Revue performed a musical adaptation of the manga called Rurouni Kenshin: Meiji Swordsman Romantic Story. The show ran from February to March, and starred Seina Sagiri as Kenshin and Miyu Sakihi as Kaoru. The musical was written and directed by Shūichirō Koike.

In 2018, a stage play adaptation was performed in Shinbashi Enbujō theater in Tokyo and Shōchikuza theater in Osaka. Seina Sagiri returned to play as Kenshin while Moka Kamishiraishi play as Kaoru. Kanō Sōzaburō, an original character introduced in the previous musical, made a return appearance played by Mitsuru Matsuoka. Shūichirō Koike returned as the director and the script writer of the play.

In 2020, a stage musical adaptation of the manga's Kyoto arc was scheduled to be held from November to December 2020 in IHI Stage Around Tokyo. Starring Teppei Koike as Himura Kenshin and Mario Kuroba as the antagonist Makoto Shishio, Shūichirō Koike returned as director and script writer of the play. This stage musical was cancelled due to COVID-19 pandemic.

Art and guidebooks
Two encyclopedias of the Rurouni Kenshin manga were released in Japan. The first one, was released first in Japan on July 4, 1996, by Shueisha and in the United States by Viz Media on November 1, 2005. , released on December 15, 1999, includes the story , which details the fates of all of the Rurouni Kenshin characters. The story takes place years after the manga's conclusion, when Kenshin and Kaoru have married and have a young son, Kenji. Many of the series' major characters who have befriended Kenshin reunite or otherwise reveal their current whereabouts with him in a spring picnic. For the anime, three Kenshin Soushi artbook were published from 1997 to 1998. While the first two were based on the TV series, the third one was based on the film. The film one was named Ishin Shishi no Requiem Art Book and was released along with the movie. Also released was Rurouni-Art Book, which contained images from the OVAs. A guidebook from the kanzenban imprint of the series was published on June 4, 2007.

Light novels
The Rurouni Kenshin light novels were published by Shueisha's Jump J-Books line and co-written by Kaoru Shizuka. Most of them are original stories which were later adapted in the anime. Others are adaptations of manga and anime stories.The very first novel, Rurouni Kenshin: Voyage to the Moon World, which was published in Japan on October 10, 1996, and in North America on October 17, 2006, details another adventure involving the return of Tales of the Meiji Season 3's Beni-Aoi Arc characters like Kaishu Katsu & the Kamiya Dojo's third pupil Daigoro. The second, Yahiko's Battle, was released on October 3, 1997. It retells various stories featured in the manga and anime series. The third novel, TV Anime Shimabara Arc, was published on February 4, 1999. A novel adaptation of Rurouni Kenshin Cinema-ban, titled  and written by Watsuki's wife Kaoru Kurosaki, which was released on September 4, 2012, is a Japanese light novel version of America's Restoration's New Kurogasa (Jin-E) Arc mangas featuring Banshin & a different younger Gein. Both are Ishin members of Enishi's team of the Jinchu/Tenchu (Judgment of Earth/Heaven) portions of the Enishi saga in the main plot manga series.

Video games
There are five Rurouni Kenshin games released for the PlayStation series of consoles. The first,  was released on November 29, 1996. It was developed by ZOOM Inc. and published by Sony Computer Entertainment. The game is a 3D fighting game with 9 playable characters, with the plot being based on the first seven volumes from the manga. The second one,  was released on December 18, 1997, and was re-released in the PlayStation The Best lineup on November 5, 1998. The game is a role-playing video game with an original story unrelated to either the manga or anime.

 is the only video game for the PlayStation 2 console. Its Japanese release was slated for September 13, 2006. The game has sold over 130,000 copies in Japan. The game was developed by Eighting and published by Banpresto. A 2D fighting game titled  was released for the PlayStation Portable on March 10, 2011, in Japan. On August 30, 2012, a sequel, was released. Both games were developed by Natsume and published by Bandai Namco Games.

Himura Kenshin also appears in the 2005 and 2006 Nintendo DS games Jump Super Stars and Jump Ultimate Stars as the sole battle character representing his series, while others were support characters and help characters. Kenshin and Shishio appeared as playable characters in the 2014 PlayStation 3 and PlayStation Vita game J-Stars Victory VS, and in the 2019 game Jump Force for Windows, PlayStation 4, and Xbox One.

Merchandise
Watsuki commented that there was a lot of Rurouni Kenshin merchandise released for the Japanese market. He recommended that buyers consider quality before paying for merchandise items and for them to consult their wallets and buy stuff that they feel is "worth it." Watsuki added that he liked the prototype for a stuffed Kenshin doll for the UFO catcher devices.

Reception

Sales and popularity
Rurouni Kenshin has been highly popular, having sold over 55 million tankōbon copies in Japan alone up until February 2012, making it one of Shueisha's top ten best-selling manga series. In 2014, it was reported that the series had 70 million tankōbon copies in circulation. As of December 2019, the manga had over 72 million copies in circulation, including digital releases. Volume 27 of the manga ranked second in the Viz Bookscan Top Ten during June 2006, while volume 21 and 20 ranked second and tenth, respectively, in the Top 10 Graphic Novels of Viz of 2005. Rurouni Kenshin volume 24 ranked 116th on USA Todays best-selling book list for the week ending February 26, 2006. During the third quarter from 2003, Rurouni Kenshin ranked at the top of ICv2's Top 50 Manga Properties. In the same poll from 2005, it was featured at the top once again based on sales from English volumes during 2004. In the Top Ten Manga Properties from 2006 from the same site, it ranked ninth. In November 2014, readers of Da Vinci magazine voted Rurouni Kenshin the 13th Weekly Shōnen Jumps greatest manga series of all time. On TV Asahi's Manga Sōsenkyo 2021 poll, in which 150,000 people voted for their top 100 manga series, Rurouni Kenshin ranked 31st.

Critical response
The manga has received praise and criticism from various publications. Mania Entertainment writer Megan Lavey found that the manga had a good balance between character development, comedy and action scenes. The artwork of Watsuki was said to have improved as the series continued, noting that characters also had reactions during fights. Steve Raiteri from Library Journal praised the series for its characters and battles. However, he noted some fights were too violent, so he recommended the series to older teenagers as well as adults. Surat described the series as an example of a "neo-shōnen" series, where a shōnen series also appeals to a female audience; Surat stated that in such series, character designs are "pretty" for female audiences, but not too "girly" for male audiences. Surat cited Shinomori Aoshi and Seta Sōjirō, characters who ranked highly in popularity polls even though, in Surat's view, Aoshi does not engage in "meaningful" battles, and Sōjirō is a "kid." Surat explained that Aoshi appears "like a Clamp character wearing Gambit's coat and Sōjirō always smiles despite the abuse inflicted upon him. Surat said that the character designs for the anime television series were "toughened up a bit." He added that the budget for animation and music was "top-notch" because Sony produced the budget. Watsuki's writing involving romance and Kenshin's psychological hidden weakpoints also earned positive response by other sites with AnimeNation also comparing it to Clamp's X based on the multiple elements the series. In general, Mania found Watsuki's art appealing as well as its evolution across the twenty-eight volumes as it made female characters more attractive while the male characters seem simpler while retaining the early handome looks.

As a result of the series taking a darker tone in later story arcs with Kenshin facing new threats and at the same time his Battosai self, Kat Kan from Voice of Youth Advocates recommended it to older teens. Kan also found that the anime viewers will also enjoy Watsuki's drawings due to the way he illustrates battles. This is mostly noted in the "Kyoto arc" where Mania Entertainment writer Megan Lavey applauded the fight between Himura Kenshin and anti-hero Saito Hajime which acts as prologue of such narrative. Mania remarks the build up Aoshi, Saito and other characters bring to the story due to how they similar goals in the same arc with newcomer Misao helping to balance the style by bringing more comical interactions with the protagonist. Although the site Manga News enjoyed Seta Sojiro's fight and how it connected with Shishio's past, they said sixteenth manga's best part was Kenshin's fight against Shishio due to the build up and symbolism the two characters have. The eventual climax led further praise based on how menacing Shishio is shown in the battle against his predecessor although he questioned if Kenshin had been a superior enemy if had kept back his original killer persona.

Critics expressed mixed opinions in regards to the final arc. Zac Bertschy from Anime News Network (ANN) praised the story from the manga, but noted that by volume 18 of the series, Watsuki started to repeat the same type of villains who were united to kill Kenshin similar to Trigun. Although he praised Watsuki's characters, he commented that some of them needed some consistency due to various "bizarre" antagonists. Due to Kaoru, Kenshin and Sanosuke missing from the final arc during the Jinchu arc, Manga News described Aoshi as the star of the series' 24th volume due to how he explores the mysteries behind Enishi's revenge and his subsequent actions that made him stand out most notably because he had been absent for multiple chapters. IGN reviewer A.E. Sparrow liked the manga's ending, praising how the storylines are resolved, and how most of the supporting cast end up. He also praised the series' characters, remarking that Kenshin "belongs in any top ten of manga heroes." Otaku USA reviewer Daryl Surat said that the manga's quality was good until the "Revenge Arc," where he criticized the storyline and the new characters. Carlo Santos from the same site, praised Enishi and Kenshin's final fight despite finding the ending predictable. While also liking their final showdown, Megan Lavey from Mania Entertainment felt that twist that happens shortly after battle is over serves to show Enishi's longlife trauma but at the same time Kenshin's compassion towards others.

Cultural impact
Before becoming an official manga author, Narutos author Masashi Kishimoto decided that he should try creating a chanbara manga since Weekly Shōnen Jump had not published a title from that genre. However, during his years of college, Kishimoto started reading Hiroaki Samura's Blade of the Immortal and Rurouni Kenshin which used the said genre. Kishimoto recalls having never been surprised by manga ever since reading Akira and found that he still was not able to compete against them. Hideaki Sorachi cited Rurouni Kenshin as a major source of inspiration for his manga series Gintama. He also said numerous other historical manga were influenced by Rurouni Kenshin, stating that the "reason why historical stories are being dealt with in all sorts of manga and game media today, and why they are being supported by the younger generation, is undoubtedly because of "Ruroken" and that they "are all children of the "Ruroken" bloodline."

For the series 25th anniversary in January 2021, 15 manga authors sent congratulatory messages: three of Watsuki's former assistants Eiichiro Oda (One Piece), Hiroyuki Takei (Shaman King), and Shinya Suzuki (Mr. Fullswing); Nobuyuki Anzai (Flame of Recca); Riichiro Inagaki (Eyeshield 21); ; Takeshi Obata (Death Note); Masashi Kishimoto (Naruto); Mitsutoshi Shimabukuro (Toriko); Hideaki Sorachi (Gintama); Yasuhiro Nightow (Trigun); Kazuhiro Fujita (Ushio & Tora); Yūsei Matsui (Assassination Classroom); and Kentaro Yabuki (Black Cat). In an interview for the event, Oda told Watsuki that Rurouni Kenshin is popular due to his loyalty to his fans. Kenshin's characterization has been compared to Yoh Asakura's, protagonist of Shaman King, due to their strict pacifism, while Kenshin's former dark side was linked to Yoh's spirit partner, the samurai Amidamaru. The lead of the manga Demon Slayer: Kimetsu no Yaiba, Tanjiro Kamado, was also influenced by Kenshin's design as the author combined the character's androgynous design with a scar similar to Kenshin's in order to balance it properly for the audience.

Watsuki felt that Kenshin was a "King Type" character similar to Monkey D. Luffy from Eiichiro Oda's One Piece as a result of how heroic they are. Watsuki also reflected on Kenshin's pacifism which became a common trend in other heroes in Weekly Shonen Jump protagonists like Luffy and Naruto Uzumaki who fight but are against the idea of killing their enemies while in the case of Dragon Ball dead characters are often revived. He believes newer series like Attack on Titan, Demon Slayer: Kimetsu no Yaiba and Jujutsu Kaisen explore more the concept of death. Nevertheless, Watsuki continued to depict Kenshin sparing his enemies in the Hokkaido Arc.

Notes

References

Further reading

External links

 Official Shueisha Rurouni Kenshin manga website 
 Rurouni Kenshin at Viz Media
 

 
1994 manga
Adventure anime and manga
Comics set in Tokyo
Fiction set in 1878
Historical anime and manga
Japanese serial novels
Jump J-Books
Madman Entertainment manga
Manga adapted into films
Martial arts anime and manga
Meiji period in fiction
Ninja in anime and manga
Romance anime and manga
Samurai in anime and manga
Shōnen manga
Shueisha franchises
Shueisha manga
Uxoricide in fiction
Viz Media manga
Viz Media novels
Works about atonement